Robert Lee Waters (June 22, 1938 – May 29, 1989) was an American football player, coach, and administrator, best known for his contributions to athletics at Western Carolina University. Waters coached the Western Carolina Catamounts football team for 20 seasons (1969–1988), and performed the dual role of athletic director from 1971 through 1986. According to the university, "the evolution and success of the school's athletic programs, especially its football program, during that period can be attributed largely to his talents and personality".

Early life
Waters grew up in Sylvania, Georgia, and was a successful athlete at Screven County High School, receiving 11 varsity letters for his participation in three different sports. He initially entered Stetson University in DeLand, Florida, as a freshman quarterback and defensive back; but when Stetson dropped the school's football program at the end of his first season Waters transferred to Presbyterian College in Clinton, South Carolina, where he served as a quarterback and defensive back on the college's team. The team was invited to the January 1960 Tangerine Bowl, meeting Middle Tennessee State; despite losing by a score of 21–12, Waters was named the game's most outstanding player. Waters was a member of the Mu chapter of the Pi Kappa Alpha fraternity at Presbyterian College.

Professional career
The National Football League's San Francisco 49ers and American Football League's Los Angeles Chargers both drafted Waters in 1960. After signing with the 49ers, Waters finished his four-year career with three touchdown passes and eight interceptions. Waters' four years with the 49ers included one as a defensive back and four as quarterback.

Coach and administrator
Waters changed career in 1965, going to Presbyterian College as an assistant coach in 1966. After two seasons with Presbyterian, Waters moved back to the West Coast as an assistant at Stanford University.

In 1969, Waters took a football coaching job at Western Carolina, bringing in a victorious season for the 1969 Catamounts in his first year, only losing to his alma mater Presbyterian College. Under his guidance, the team made national rankings in 1972 and 1974, and he took the Catamounts to the 1983 NCAA Division I-AA Football Championship Game. According to the university's website, his tenure at Western Carolina produced "116 victories, 13 winning seasons and top 10 national finishes at three different levels (NAIA, NCAA Division II, NCAA Division I-AA)". He coached 13 All-Americans and 36 All-Southern Conference players. During the 1971–1986 seasons, Waters also served as athletic director.  During his service to the university, he directed Western Carolina's moves from NAIA to NCAA Division II, then to NCAA Division I, and gained entrance into the Southern Conference. He helped raise interest in the construction of E. J. Whitmire Stadium in 1974 and Hennon Stadium in 1986.

Death
In March 1989, during the progression of amyotrophic lateral sclerosis (ALS, or Lou Gehrig's disease), Waters was reassigned from his head coaching position by university chancellor Myron Coulter. Waters died on May 29, 1989, at his home in Cullowhee, North Carolina, at the age of 50 following a six-year battle with the disease.

Legacy
In 1988, Waters was honored by Western Carolina, who named their playing field Bob Waters Field at E. J. Whitmire Stadium. Waters has been inducted into the South Carolina Athletic Hall of Fame, the Florida Citrus Bowl Hall of Fame, and the Western Carolina Athletic Hall of Fame.

Head coaching record

References

1939 births
1989 deaths
American football quarterbacks
Presbyterian Blue Hose football coaches
San Francisco 49ers players
Stanford Cardinal football coaches
Western Carolina Catamounts athletic directors
Western Carolina Catamounts football coaches
Stetson University alumni
People from Millen, Georgia
Players of American football from Georgia (U.S. state)
Neurological disease deaths in North Carolina
Deaths from motor neuron disease
People from Sylvania, Georgia